The 18th term of the Grand National Assembly of Turkey lasted from 29 November 1987 to 20 October 1991.
There were 450 MPs in the parliament. Motherland Party (ANAP) held the majority. Social Democrat Populist Party (SHP) and True Path Party (DYP) were the other parties.

Main parliamentary milestones 
Some of the important events in the history of the parliament are the following:
22 December 1987 – Turgut Özal of ANAP formed the 46th government of Turkey
10 May 1988 – Civil Code amended; divorcing became easier.
 25 September 1988 – Referendum on snap election. The governmental proposal was rejected.
31 October 1989 – Turgut Özal was elected as the 8th president of Turkey.
9 November  1989 - Yıldırım Akbulut of ANAP formed the 47th government of Turkey.
7 June 1990 – A group of MPs from SHP resigned from the party and formed People's Labor Party (HEP).
23 June 1991 - Mesut Yılmaz  of ANAP formed the 48th government of Turkey.
 20 October 1991 - General election held.

List of members

References

1987 establishments in Turkey
1991 disestablishments in Turkey
Terms of the Grand National Assembly of Turkey
18th parliament of Turkey
Social Democratic Populist Party (Turkey)
Democrat Party (Turkey, current)
Motherland Party (Turkey)
Political history of Turkey